We Cheer 2, known in Japan as , is a dance video game releases by Namco Bandai Games. It is the sequel to We Cheer.

Gameplay
The gameplay is the same as the original We Cheer using the Wii Remote as a virtual pom-poms. In the single player mode, players can use either two Wii Remotes (one in each hand) or one Wii Remote (in either the left or right hand) to follow the on-screen motions. The game also offers cooperative and competitive modes for up to 4 players. New to the game are further customization of characters and the ability to play as a male or female cheerleader.

Development
The game features 36 licensed music tracks.

Reception

The game received "mixed" reviews according to the review aggregation website Metacritic. In Japan, Famitsu gave it a score of one eight, two sevens, and one eight for a total of 30 out of 40.

See also
All Star Cheer Squad
All Star Cheer Squad 2
We Cheer

References

External links
 

2009 video games
Cheerleader video games
Cheerleading
Music video games
Bandai Namco games
Video games developed in Japan
Video games featuring protagonists of selectable gender
Wii-only games
Wii games